Sándor Bácsi (26 November 1969) is a former Hungarian professional footballer who played as a forward. He was a member of the Hungarian national football team.

Career

Volán FC 
He made his debut for Volán FC in NBII at the age of eighteen. He was considered to be a huge talent, and his incredible running speed and Maradona-like physique, combined with his agility, gave him the right to be so. In September 1987, he made his debut in the second division at home against III. Kerületi TVE, coming on at the break and making it 2–2 with two goals in two minutes!

Újpest FC 
He played for Újpest FC from 1986. He made his debut in the top flight in 1989. He was a member of the 1989-90 champion team and of the team that won the Hungarian Cup two years later against Vác FC. He was also a member of the Újpest FC team that won the Szuperkupa against Ferencvárosi TC.

Gödöllői LC 
He constantly struggled with weight problems. In 1993 he played for Vasas SC for a short time, but he could not adapt to the demands of the first division and continued his career with Gödöllői LC.

National team 
Between 1989 and 1991 he played 2 times for the Hungarian national football team.

Honours 

 Nemzeti Bajnokság I (NB I)
 Champion: 1989
 Magyar Kupa (MNK)
 Winner: 1992

References 

1969 births
Living people
Hungarian footballers
Hungary international footballers
Footballers from Budapest
Association football forwards
Újpest FC players
Vasas SC players
Gödöllői FC footballers
Nemzeti Bajnokság I players
Nemzeti Bajnokság II players